The Deep Tunnel is an adit at Hercherhof near Freiburg, Germany. It is a part of the Schauinsland mine complex and was built for the Stolberg Zink AG to provide easier access to the seventh floor level of the Roggenbergschacht mine. Construction began in 1938. It was termed part of the Four Year Plan, an economic plan designed to prepare Nazi Germany for war, and Hermann Göring's name was invoked in a dispute between the mining company and the state environmental protection agency when the agency requested the greening of excavated material.

It should replace the existing goods cable lift near the railway to secure the transport via Freiburg and then
to the Stolberg Zink AG in Pforzheim for further processing. 
The driving started in 1938 after the mining rights were acquired in 1935. This new approach was due to the development of the new flotation process.
Thus, the ancient disposal heaps of former ore washing were processed.
The tunnel's size of 2.5m by 2.5m accommodated the horses had been used as carriers. 
In 1944 this Tunnel achieved a length of more than 3.4 km, 
exploited by prisoners of war. The final connection to the Leopold gallery must
have been accomplished in 1946. This level was in use until 1954.
However, in the 1960s the tunnel collapsed 720 meters away from the Kappel valley entrance.

This underground construction is part of a larger medieval silver mine 
in the Schauinsland mountain near Freiburg in Breisgau, sign of the last war efforts to
extract zinc and lead ore from this area.
Today the large mining complex is a repository for historical documents, adventure mine to attract
tourists, students and amateur geologists as well as further underground research.
The planned extension to the northern ore dressing part was not completed i.e. 300m remains 
unaccomplished. Therefore, the Deep Tunnel never could fulfill its function as transporting way.
So it only served for the manriding of Kappel's miners and the mine's water drainage.

See also
 Berthold Steiber: Der Schauinsland. Geschichte, Geologie, Mineralien. Doris Bode Verlag, Haltern. 1986.

References

Former mines in Germany
Buildings and structures in Baden-Württemberg